The migrated provinces, commanderies and counties were the consequences of a special administrative regionalization called qiao zhi implemented during the Six Dynasties era of China. The Shahumyan Province is a modern analogue of their alternative local government, in their infancy. With adoption of tu duan and merger, these nominal subdivisions transitioned to regular administrative divisions.

Background 
Since the Upheaval of the Five Barbarians, a large number of northern refugees migrated south. These migrants who called "qiao ren" (literally the migrated people) were the base of the migrated provinces, commanderies, and counties. Bearing northern place names, they were set up by the Eastern Jin dynasty. Such a move was not unprecedented, the central government migrated the whole commandery or county to a new place as early as the Han dynasty. However, they emerged on a massive scale since the Eastern Jin.

History 
During the reigns of the Emperor Yuan, Emperor Ming and Emperor Cheng, the migrated provinces, commanderies and counties were concentrated in the area south of the Huai River and the Lower Yangtze Plain.
The earlier typical classic examples was migrated Langya Commandery (its original counterpart in modern Linyi, Shandong) within migrated Fei County in Jiankang, but they were certainly not the earliest. At least migrated Huaide County (its original counterpart in modern Fuping, Shaanxi) was established in there, around 320 before that. According to the Book of Song:(After Disaster of Yongjia, the refugees from You, Ji, Qing, Bing, Yan and Xu provinces came across the Huai River, some even came across the Yangtze River and stayed in Jinling Commandery... The migrated commanderies and counties were established to govern them. The seats of Xu and Yan provinces perhaps were moved to the area north of the Yangtze River, where the migrated You, Ji, Qing, Bing provinces were established also.)

Purposes 
 declaring the legitimacy of government
 claiming to the occupied northern territory and evoking people's desire to resume
 deadening the homesickness of qiao ren
 manifesting the higher status of the qiao ren who came from the aristocratic clans
 attracting the Han Chinese in the North cross the border to pledge to the South authorities
 fostering economic growth

The belts where qiao ren lived subdivided into 3 administrative levels, similar to the ordinary administrative divisions:
 migrated provinces or qiao zhou
 migrated commanderies or qiao jun
 migrated counties or qiao xian
After Emperor Wu of Liu Song recaptured some lost northern territory, some of them there were prefixed with "north" or "bei" to distinguish them from their migrated counterparts in the south. After Liu founded the Liu Song, the prefix bei was dropped while migrated place names that had derived from their prototypes in the north took on the prefix "south" or "nan". Still, there were a few exceptions to prefixed with "east" or "dong" and "west" or "xi". For instance, Dong Jingzhao (in modern Xingyang) and Xi Jingzhao (in modern Hanzhong).

As time goes by, the migrated provinces, commanderies and counties plunged the administrative divisions into chaos. For instance, Yinping County was located in the southeastern part of Gansu Province nowadays initially. While it had four migrated counterparts.

Development

Baiji and huangji 
Considering most property of qiao ren had been lost or exhausted as they arrived, they were privileged to be free from diao, a special poll tax was paid via the silken or cotton cloth etc. in the ancient China, and service. Their registers which bound in white papers were called baiji in Chinese. The ordinary ones which bound in yellow papers were called huangji in comparison.

Over a given period, baiji was a preferential identification states the bearer's hometown. The imperial court had a specific intent,  which scarcely be succeeded,to sort out hukou conveniently in the future after regaining the lost territory.

Abolition 
Fan Ning once submitted a memorial to the throne:(In olden days, subdividing the territory was for the benefit of the ordinary people; while a former noble monarch devised the system, he would be fair to his people without distinction between huangji and baiji. Since the civilians were displaced by the war, the refugees who sought shelter in the Lower Yangtze Plain could revolt at any time. In such circumstances, they were allowed to live there with privilege and hold baiji, which states the bearer's hometown. That would have been a long time ago. They are living in peace and security now, while their ancestors' tombs are arranged in rows, even though where they are living is not their hometown. It is high time to regularize the boundary again, adopt tu duan to register, make the criterion for validating the qualification of civil servants explicit, and legislate the civil code...)Once the situation settled down and the population swelled, the considerable amount of northerners flooding into the south magnified the economic and social problems. Reforms were clearly in order. Hence, tu duan was an increasingly important issue for the Eastern Jin and the subsequent Southern dynasties.

Tu duan policy 
The tu duan is the abbreviation for yi tu duan (means classifying people according to their present habitation). The terms were firstly mentioned in the Book of Jin:It was a solution to put an end to the chaos the migrated provinces, commanderies and counties brought, and ensure the hukou system operated smoothly.

Ten times in total tu duan implemented in the Eastern Jin and the Southern dynasties.
 the 1st began in Xianhe era
 the 2nd began in 341
 the 3rd began in 364: Gengxu tu duan
 the 4th began in 413: Yixi tu duan
 the 5th
 the 6th began in 457
 the 7th began in 473
 the 8th began in 480
 the 9th began in 502
 the 10th began in 560
Had misgivings about the potential conflict of interest, the government was obliged to meet some qiao ren, especially the constituent parts of the Beifu Army, halfway every time the policy was implemented.

Influence

References

Citation

Sources

Further reading 
 Hu, Axiang (2003). 六朝疆域与政区述论
 Hu, Axiang (2006). 侨置的源流与东晋南朝侨州郡县的产生

Administrative divisions of China
Political history of China
Chinese irredentism